Anjuman-i-Khurd is a village in Afghanistan. It lies within the Anjuman Valley, about 18 miles from the mouth of the valley. Another village, Anjuman, lies close by. Around the turn of the 20th century, the village had 30 occupied residences, primarily Tajiks. The grazing in the area was good, and the inhabitants were a peaceful lot, and relatively poorly armed.
Khurd and Kalan Persian language word which means small and Big respectively when two villages have same name then it is distinguished as Kalan means Big and Khurd means Small with Village Name.

References

Populated places in Kuran wa Munjan District